Reb Yoel Kahan (February 14, 1930 – July 15, 2021) was a senior Chabad rabbi, who served as the leading  and  for the   Lubavitcher Rebbe, Rabbi Menachem Mendel Schneerson. His position as leading  and  made him the default authority on the Rebbe's teachings and one of the most universally recognized scholars of general Chabad Chassidic doctrine.

Early life

He was born in Moscow, on February 14, 1930. He was the youngest of four children born to Refoel Nachman and Rivkah (Davidson) Kahan. His father studied in the original Yeshiva Tomchei Temimim, in the town of Lubavitch, White Russia and authored Shemu'os VeSippurim an authoritative and multi-volume compilation of historical accounts and anecdotes, culled from the traditions handed down by reliable Chassidim of earlier generations and his own experiences. 

In 1935 Kahan emigrated to Mandatory Palestine together with his family, and studied in Yeshiva "Achai Temimim" in Tel Aviv under the tutelage of the Mashpia Rabbi Chaim Shaul Brook. During his teen years he also studied privately with the Mashpia Rabbi Moshe Gourarie. He also knew and was influenced by Rabbi Nochum Goldshmidt and to a lesser degree, by Rabbi Shlomo Chaim Kesselman.

Arrival in New York

In 1950 Kahan traveled to New York in order to continue his studies at the central Yeshiva Tomchei Temimim at 770 Eastern Parkway in Brooklyn, New York. At the time 770 was also the home and synagogue of Rabbi Yosef Yitzchok Schneersohn, the sixth Rebbe of Chabad, and Kahn expected to be able to meet R' Schneersohn, whose teachings he had studied all his life. However, when he finally arrived in New York by sea it was too late, the man who was to become known as "the Previous Rebbe" had already died.

Kahan remained in New York and soon became attracted to the teachings of Schneersohn's younger son-in-law, Rabbi Menachem Mendel Schneerson, who eventually became the seventh Rebbe of Chabad.

In 1954 he married Leah Butman.

For decades Kahan served as Schneerson's main , repeater.  He would listen to the talks and then, after consultation with colleagues, repeat the talks to the Hasidim to transcribe them for print.

He served in this role from the beginning of the Rebbe's leadership in 1950 until the Rebbe's death in 1994. 

Following Schneerson's death, he continued to serve as the senior Mashpia in the central Lubavitcher yeshiva at 770 Eastern Parkway.  He was referred to familiarly amongst Chabad Chasidim as Reb Yoel.

Death
Kahan died on July 15, 2021. He had no children.

Works
 Biurim U'Pninim on Tanya (HaMa'or She'baTorah)
 Sefer Ha'Erchim (main editor and compiler - Kehot)
 Nos'im BaChassidut (Eishel-Kfar Chabad)
 Mahutam Shel Yisroel (Heichal Menachem)
 Shiurim BeTorat Chabad (Ma'ayanotecha)
 HaModaim B'Chassidut (Ma'ayanotecha)
 Sugyot B'Chassidut (Ma'ayanotecha)
 Shiurim Al Sha'ar Yichud V'Ha'Emuna (Ma'ayanotecha)
 Nos'im BaYahadut (tape series)
 Machshevet haChassidut (The philosophy of Chassidut, 2 volumes)

References

External links
Interview by JEM with Rabbi Yoel Kahan
Talks by Reb Yoel Kahn with English subtitles

1930 births
2021 deaths
Chabad-Lubavitch rabbis
Hasidic rabbis in Israel
American Hasidic rabbis
People from Tel Aviv
20th-century American rabbis
Chabad-Lubavitch Mashpiim
Soviet emigrants to the United States